Dr. B.R. Ambedkar State Institute of Medical Sciences, established in 2021, is a full-fledged tertiary Government Medical college and hospital. This college is located at SAS Nagar, Mohali, in Punjab. The college offers the degree of Bachelor of Medicine and Surgery (MBBS). The college is recognized by National Medical Commission and is affiliated with the Baba Farid University of Health Sciences. Like all other Indian medical colleges, student admission in this college happens on the basis of merit through National Eligibility and Entrance Test. The hospital associated with this college is one of the largest hospitals in Mohali.

Courses
Dr. B.R. Ambedkar State Institute of Medical Sciences undertakes the education and training of students in MBBS courses.

References

External links 

Educational institutions established in 2021
Medical colleges in Punjab, India
2021 establishments in Punjab, India